Kristýna Kolocová (born 1 April 1988) is a former Czech beach volleyball player. She and Markéta Sluková placed 5th at the 2012 Summer Olympics in London.  They qualified from Group C, then beat the Brazilian team of Antonelli and Antunes in the round of 16.  They lost to the team of Jennifer Kessy and April Ross, the eventual silver medalists, in the quarter finals.

Kolocová announced her retirement in August 2018.

References 

1988 births
Czech beach volleyball players
Living people
Beach volleyball players at the 2012 Summer Olympics
Olympic beach volleyball players of the Czech Republic
People from Nymburk
Women's beach volleyball players
Sportspeople from the Central Bohemian Region